Baba Rud or Babarud may refer to:
 Baba Rud, Hamadan
 Babarud, West Azerbaijan